Dongyang Town is a town in Liuyang, Hunan, China.  it had a population of 41,000 and an area of .  It borders Beisheng Town in the north, Jiaoxi Township in the east, Yong'an Town in the west, and Taipingqiao Town, Gejia Town and Changsha County in the south.

Administrative division
The town is divided into six villages and five communities, the following areas: Dongyang Community, Dongyuan Community, Nanyuan Community, Beiyuan Community, Xingfuquan Community, Longdong Village, Jiuxi Village, Chengshan Village, Guanqian Village, Changdong Village, and Xiyuan Village.

Geography
The Laodao River flows through the town.

Dongyang Reservoir is the second largest body of water in the town.

Economy
The Liuyang Economic and Technological Development Zone and Liuyang Biomedical Park is located in the town.

Education
Public junior high school in the town includes Dongyang Meddle School.

Attractions
Lingsheng Temple is a Buddhist temple located in the town.

Transportation
 National Highway: G319
 Expressway: Changsha-Liuyang Expressway, Liuyang-Liling Expressway, Daweishan-Liuyang Expressway
 County Road: Yongshe Xian, Liuhu Xian

References

External links

Divisions of Liuyang
Liuyang